John Chad (born September 16, 1919 in Provost, Alberta - d. October 11, 1970) was a Canadian retired professional ice hockey forward who played 79 games in the National Hockey League for the Chicago Black Hawks.

External links
 

1919 births
1970 deaths
Canadian ice hockey forwards
Chicago Blackhawks players
Ice hockey people from Alberta
Providence Reds players